Kalanchoe orgyalis a species of flowering plant in the Crassulaceae family. It is a succulent commonly known as copper spoons due to its leaf shape.

References

orgyalis
Flora of Madagascar
Taxa named by John Gilbert Baker